The Provincial Assembly of Gandaki Province also known as the Gandaki Province Sabha, (Nepali: गण्डकी प्रदेश सभा) is a unicameral governing and law making body of Gandaki Province, one of the seven provinces in Nepal. The assembly is seated at the provincial capital Pokhara in Kaski District at the Urban Development Training Centre. The assembly has 60 members of whom 36 are elected through first-past-the-post voting and 24 of whom are elected through proportional representation. The term of the assembly is five years until dissolved earlier.

The present First Provincial Assembly was constituted in 2017, after the 2017 provincial elections. The next election will take place when the five year term ends by November 2022.

History 
The Provincial Assembly of Gandaki Province is formed under Article 175 of the Constitution of Nepal 2015 which guarantees a provincial legislative for each province in the country. The first provincial elections were conducted for all seven provinces in Nepal and the elections in Gandaki Province was conducted for 60 seats to the assembly. The first meeting of the provincial assembly was held on 4 February 2018. Netra Nath Adhikari from Maoist Centre was elected as the first speaker of the provincial assembly, and Srijana Sharma from CPN (UML) as the first deputy speaker of the provincial assembly.

List of assemblies

Committees 
Article 195 of the Constitution of Nepal provides provincial assemblies the power to form special committees in order to manage working procedures.

Current composition

See also 
 Gandaki Province
 Provincial assemblies of Nepal

References 

Government of Gandaki Province
Province legislatures of Nepal
Unicameral legislatures